Ricochet is the debut studio album by the American country music band of the same name. Released in 1996 on Columbia Records Nashville, it produced four hit singles on the Billboard Hot Country Singles & Tracks (now Hot Country Songs) charts: "What Do I Know", "Daddy's Money" (a Number One), "Love Is Stronger Than Pride", and "Ease My Troubled Mind". The album itself has been certified gold by the RIAA.

Two of the singles were previously recorded by other artists: "What Do I Know" by Linda Davis on 1996's Some Things Are Meant to Be, and "Ease My Troubled Mind" by Tim Ryan on 1993's Idle Hands.

Track listing

Personnel

Ricochet
Jeff Bryant – drums, background vocals
Junior Bryant – fiddle, mandolin, background vocals
Greg Cook – bass guitar, background vocals
Teddy Carr – steel guitar, Dobro, background vocals
Eddie Kilgallon – keyboards, acoustic guitar, saxophone, background vocals
Heath Wright – lead vocals, electric guitar, fiddle

Additional musicians
Bruce Bouton – steel guitar
Mike Brignardello – bass guitar
Joe Chemay – bass guitar
Larry Franklin – fiddle
John Hobbs – piano
Brent Rowan – electric guitar
Biff Watson – acoustic guitar
Lonnie Wilson – drums

Charts

Weekly charts

Year-end charts

References

1996 debut albums
Columbia Records albums
Ricochet (band) albums
Albums produced by Ron Chancey